Hyperdontia is the condition of having supernumerary teeth, or teeth that appear in addition to the regular number of teeth (32 in the average adult). They can appear in any area of the dental arch and can affect any dental organ. The opposite of hyperdontia is hypodontia, where there is a congenital lack of teeth, which is a condition seen more commonly than hyperdontia. The scientific definition of hyperdontia is "any tooth or odontogenic structure that is formed from tooth germ in excess of usual number for any given region of the dental arch." The additional teeth, which may be few or many, can occur on any place in the dental arch. Their arrangement may be symmetrical or non-symmetrical.

Signs and symptoms
The presence of a supernumerary tooth, particularly when seen in young children, is associated with a disturbance of the maxillary incisor region. This commonly results in the impaction of the incisors during the mixed dentition stage. The study debating this also considered many other factors such as: the patient's age, number, morphology, growth orientation and position of the supernumerary tooth. Alongside this issue, the presence of an extra tooth can impede the eruption of adjacent additional or normal teeth. Therefore, the presence of a supernumerary tooth when found must be approached with the appropriate treatment plan, incorporating the likelihood of incisal crowding. In some individuals, the additional teeth can erupt far from the dental arch, within the maxillary sinus. The extra teeth may also migrate to a different location after development. In some cases, supernumerary teeth can lead to the formation of cysts. Crowding is also frequently seen in people with hyperdontia.

Causes
There is evidence of hereditary factors along with some evidence of environmental factors leading to this condition. While a single excess tooth is relatively common, multiple hyperdontia is rare in people with no other associated diseases or syndromes. Many supernumerary teeth never erupt, but they may delay eruption of nearby teeth or cause other dental or orthodontic problems. Molar-type extra teeth are the most common type. Dental X-rays are often used to diagnose hyperdontia.

It is suggested that supernumerary teeth develop from a third tooth bud arising from the dental lamina near the regular tooth bud or possibly from splitting the regular tooth bud itself. Supernumerary teeth in deciduous (baby) teeth are less common than in permanent teeth.

Related conditions
Hyperdontia is seen in a number of disorders, including Gardner's syndrome and cleidocranial dysostosis, where multiple supernumerary teeth develop.

Other associated conditions are: Cleidocranial dysplasia, Ehlers–Danlos syndrome Type III, Ellis–van Creveld syndrome, Gardner's syndrome, Goldenhar syndrome, Hallermann–Streiff syndrome, Orofaciodigital syndrome type I, Incontinentia pigmenti, Marfan syndrome, Nance–Horan syndrome, and Tricho-rhino-phalangeal syndrome Type 1.

Diagnosis 

Supernumerary teeth may be detected by taking two different dental X-rays at different angles. Examples of this may be an intra-oral X-ray (one that is taken inside the mouth) and a panoramic radiograph. However, these X-rays are 2D and therefore do not accurately portray the 3D view of the teeth.

Types

Supernumerary teeth can be classified by shape and by position. The shapes include the following:
 Supplemental (where the tooth has a normal shape for the teeth in that series);
 Tuberculate (also called barrel shaped);
 Conical (also called peg shaped);
 Compound odontoma (multiple small tooth-like forms);
 Complex odontoma (a disorganized mass of dental tissue)

When classified by position, a supernumerary tooth may be referred to as a mesiodens, a paramolar, or a distomolar. Occasionally, these teeth do not erupt into the oral cavity but manifest as a malocclusion.

The most common supernumerary tooth is a mesiodens, which is a malformed, peg-like tooth that occurs between the maxillary central incisors.

Fourth and fifth molars that form behind the third molars are another kind of supernumerary teeth.

Treatment
Although these teeth are usually asymptomatic and pose no threat to the individual, they are often extracted for aesthetic reasons, to allow the eruption of other teeth, orthodontic reasons and/or suspected pathology. This is done particularly if the mesiodens is positioned in the maxillary central incisor region. The traditional method of removal is done by using bone chisels, although a more advanced technique has been found to be more beneficial, especially if surgery is required. Through the use of piezoelectricity, piezoelectric ultrasonic bone surgery may be more time-consuming than the traditional method but it seems to reduce the post-operative bleeding and associated complications quite significantly.

Epidemiology
It is evident that hyperdontia is more common in the permanent dentition than in the primary. There is a considerable difference between males and females in the prevalence of these teeth in permanent dentition; hyperdontia is twice as common in males as in females. However, this approximation varies in terms of location, other associating syndromes that may be present, and the ethnicity of the individual. In terms of ethnicity, it can be seen that hyperdontia is in fact less common in European than in Asian populations. There is evidence to show that an individual is more likely to have hyperdontia if other members of their family also have the condition.

References

External links 

Supernumerary body parts
Developmental tooth pathology
Teeth
Accessory bone